Tân An is a township (thị trấn) of Yên Dũng District, Bắc Giang Province, in northeastern Vietnam.

References

Populated places in Bắc Giang province
Communes of Bắc Giang province
Townships in Vietnam